Immortal Songs: Singing the Legend, also known as Immortal Songs 2, is a South Korean television music competition program presented by Shin Dong-yup. It is a revival of Immortal Songs (2007–2009), and each episode features singers who perform their reinterpreted versions of songs.

The program airs a new episode every Saturday on KBS2, and re-airs it with English subtitles on KBS World a week later in the same time frame.

Synopsis 
Originally broadcast as Immortal Songs 2 as a part of KBS Saturday Freedom, each episode featured six idol singers who would perform songs by the singer of the episode. After restructuring in 2012, the show returned on April 7 as an independent program and rebranded as Immortal Songs: Singing the Legend. Each episode now features seven singers or groups from diverse backgrounds and years of experience, ranging from members of popular K-pop idol groups to legendary solo artists. As before, they each perform their own reinterpreted versions of famous songs by the legendary singer of the episode. A noted feature of the new format is the "special episodes" which revolve around specific themes, such as festive or commemorate events.

Guest singers are seated in a waiting room with the three hosts, where they introduce themselves to viewers. The order of performances is decided randomly by presenter Shin Dong-yup drawing a ball containing the performer's name, and the 500-member audience vote after each round for their favorite performance. The performer with the most votes on the episode wins. Starting February 15, 2020, due to the COVID-19 pandemic, the votes were done by 20 special judges (mostly KBS employees). They scored the artist, but the score was not shown on screen and instead a light was used to indicate the winner.

Starting August 22, 2020, the show was re-branded as Immortal Songs. Moon Hee-joon & Jung Jae-hyung both left the program after being part of it for 9 & 8 years respectively and it was announced that Kim Jun-hyun and Kim Shin-young will be replacing them. The show's third waiting room host, Kim Tae-woo, left in June 2021 after 3 years. He was replaced by trot singer Shin Yu in July 2021 but he left the show in October and was replaced by a series of guest hosts (see below). Kim Shin-young also left the show in November and Lee Chan-won was named permanent host on November 20, 2021 so him and Kim Jun-hyun are now the only 2 official waiting room hosts.

On November 4, 2021, KBS announced that it will reopen their music shows to a live audience for the first time since January 2020 when the COVID-19 pandemic began. Immortal Songs began taping episodes with a reduced live audience in late November and episode 536 was the first episode to air with an audience on December 11, 2021 with the light system remaining as the method to indicate a winner.

Cast

Main MC
 Shin Dong-yup (2011–present)

Guest MC
 Lee Geum-hee (March 19 & 26, 2022)

Waiting Room Hosts

Current
 Kim Jun-hyun (2020–present)
 Lee Chan-won (2021–present)

Guest
 Tei (Jul. 21, 2018)
 Na Tae-joo (Sept. 18, 2021)
 Park Ji-won (Oct. 9-23, Nov. 6, Nov. 27, Dec. 4, 2021)
 Lee Chan-won (Oct. 30, 2021, later named permanent host)
 Young Tak (Nov. 13, 2021)
 Jang Minho (Nov. 20, 2021, July 9, 2022)
 Ravi (Dec. 11, 2021)
 Jo Woo-jong (Jan. 1, 2022)
 Hoshi (Seventeen)  (May 28, 2022)
 Hwang Chi-yeul (June 25, October 8 & 15, 2022)
 Kim Hee-jae (January 21, 2023)

Former
 Kim Gu-ra (2011-2012)
 Jun Hyun-moo (2012)
 Lee Soo-geun (2012)
 Park Hyun-bin (2013)
 Eun Ji-won (2013-2014)
 Yoon Min-soo (2015-2016)
 Hwang Chi-yeul (2017-2018)
 Moon Hee-joon (2011-2020)
 Jung Jae-hyung (2012-2020)
 Kim Tae-woo (2018-2021)
 Shin Yu (2021)
 Kim Shin-young (2020-2021)

2013 

Singers listed in order of performance.

2014 

Singers listed in order of performance.

2015 

Singers listed in order of performance.

2016 

Singers listed in order of performance.

2017 

Singers listed in order of performance.

2018 

Singers listed in order of performance.

2019

Singers listed in order of performance.

2020

Singers listed in order of performance.

2021

Singers listed in order of performance.

2022

Singers listed in order of performance.

2023

Singers listed in order of performance.

Awards and nominations

Notes

References

External links
  
 

2011 South Korean television series debuts
2012 South Korean television series endings
2012 South Korean television series debuts
Korean-language television shows
Korean Broadcasting System original programming
South Korean variety television shows
South Korean music television shows
Music competitions in South Korea